This is a list of football games played by the South Korea national football team between 1980 and 1989.

Results by year
{| class="wikitable" style="text-align: center"
!Year
! width="30" |GP
! width="30" |W
! width="30" |D
! width="30" |L
! width="30" |Win %
|-
|1980

|-
|1981

|-
|1982

|-
|1983

|-
|1984

|-
|1985

|-
|1986

|-
|1987

|-
|1988

|-
|1989

|-
!Total

|}

List of matches

1980

Source:

1981

Source:

1982

Source:

1983

Source:

1984

Source:

1985

Source:

1986

Source:

1987

Source:

1988

Source:

1989

Source:

See also
 South Korea national football team results
 South Korea national football team

References

External links
 Results at KFA 

1980s in South Korean sport
1980